An election for the election of the delegation from Finland to the European Parliament took place on 25 May 2014 with advance voting from 14 to 20 May. Finnish voters elected thirteen members to the European Parliament.

Opinion polls

Results

MEPs elected

National Coalition Party
Alexander Stubb* – 148,190 votes
Sirpa Pietikäinen – 49,842 votes
Henna Virkkunen – 43,829 votes

Centre Party
Olli Rehn – 70,398 votes
Paavo Väyrynen – 69,360 votes
Anneli Jäätteenmäki – 59,538 votes

Finns Party
Jussi Halla-aho – 80,772 votes
Sampo Terho – 33,833 votes

Social Democratic Party
Liisa Jaakonsaari – 44,061 votes
Miapetra Kumpula-Natri – 40,734 votes

Green League
Heidi Hautala – 31,725 votes

 Left Alliance
Merja Kyllönen – 58,611 votes

Swedish People's Party
Nils Torvalds – 29,355 votes

* Note: Alexander Stubb was chosen to be National Coalition Party chairman in June, and was subsequently appointed Prime Minister. Stubb did not take his seat in the European Parliament. The seat went to Petri Sarvamaa, who had the fourth most votes (37,862) on the NCP list.

Most voted-for candidates

References

External links

Finland
European Parliament elections in Finland
European